Ljudmila Novak (born 1 August 1959) is a Slovenian politician and a Member of the European Parliament. She is the president of the New Slovenia – Christian People's Party. Since 21 December 2011, she has been the vice-president of the Slovenian National Assembly.

Early life and career
Novak was born in Maribor. She studied Slovene and German language at the University of Maribor. Between 1982 and 2001, she worked as a school teacher, first in Murska Sobota, and then in Višnja Gora and finally in Moravče.

Political career
Novak entered politics in 2001, when she was elected mayor of Moravče. In 2002, she became a member of the Executive Council of New Slovenia party. In 2004, she was elected to the European Parliament. As a member of the European People's Party, she was named a member of the Committee on Culture and Education. In 2022, she joined the Committee of Inquiry to investigate the use of Pegasus and equivalent surveillance spyware. She is also a substitute for the Committee on Regional Development, a member of the delegation to the ACP-EU Joint Parliamentary Assembly and a substitute for the delegation for relations with Mercosur.

After the Slovenian parliamentary election of 2008, when New Slovenia failed to gain any seats in the National Assembly (NA), the lower house of the Slovenian parliament, Novak was elected president of the party. At the 2011 Slovenian parliamentary election, the party won 4 seats in the NA.

She learned and practiced the language Esperanto in her youth, but she does not actively speak it today.  She still understands it. In 2007 she participated in the 7th congress of the European Esperanto Union in Maribor, Slovenia.
On 21 January 2009 she presented to the European Parliament in the Committee of Culture (under the sign PE 416.668v01-00) in the framework of the debate/opinion on multilingualism of Vasco Graça Moura three proposals for change in article 4, touching on Esperanto.

References

External links
 Official website
 

 

1959 births
Living people
Members of the National Assembly (Slovenia)
MEPs for Slovenia 2004–2009
Deputy Prime Ministers of Slovenia
Ministers for Slovenes abroad
New Slovenia MEPs
Politicians from Maribor
Slovenian Esperantists
Women MEPs for Slovenia
University of Maribor alumni
Vice-Presidents of the National Assembly (Slovenia)
Women government ministers of Slovenia
MEPs for Slovenia 2019–2024